Songs from the Chinese Poets are series of song settings,  by Granville Bantock. The English song texts were mainly supplied by Captain L. A. Cranmer Byng (1872-1945), who had also supplied the text for Choral Suite from the Chinese (1914). Launcelot Alfred Cranmer-Byng was part of the Byng baronets family and wrote various books on China.

In 1933 the first set were also arranged in the form of a four movement string quartet under the title In a Chinese Mirror. It was recorded for the first time by the Tippett Quartet in 2021.

Songs
Songs from the Chinese Poets, Series I (1918)
The old fisherman of the mists and waters
The ghost road
Under the moon
The celestial weaver
Return of spring

Songs from the Chinese Poets, Series II (1919)
The tomb of Chao-Chün 
A dream of spring
Desolation
The Island of Pines
The pavilion of abounding joy

Songs from the Chinese Poets, Series III
From the tomb of an unknown woman
Adrift
The golden nenuphar
Yung-Yang
A feast of lanterns

Songs from the Chinese Poets, Series IV
Autumn across the Frontier
The Kingfisher's Tower
On the banks of Jo-Eh
Despair
The last revel

Songs from the Chinese Poets, Series V
The court of dreams
Down the Hwai
Night on the mountain
The lost one
Memories with the dusk return
And there are tears

Songs from the Chinese Poets, Series VI
The King of Tang
Wild geese
Exile
Willow flowers
Dreaming at Golden Hill
Galloping home

Recordings
John McCormack (tenor) recorded "Desolation" in Australia in 1927.

References

External links
 From :
 Songs from the Chinese Poets: Set I
 Songs from the Chinese Poets: Set II
 Songs from the Chinese Poets: Set III
 Songs from the Chinese Poets: Set IV
 Songs from the Chinese Poets: Set V
 Songs from the Chinese Poets: Set VI
1917 songs